Andrew Copp (born July 8, 1994) is an American professional ice hockey forward for the Detroit Red Wings of the National Hockey League (NHL). He was selected in the fourth round, 104th overall, by the Winnipeg Jets in the 2013 NHL Entry Draft.

Early life
Copp was born on July 8, 1994, in Ann Arbor, Michigan, U.S. to parents Andy and Anne Marie Copp. His mother was a figure skating coach for the University of Michigan Wolverines and his father coached his youth hockey teams. His younger brother Tyler also played ice hockey growing up, but chose to pursue golf and attend Mercer University.

Playing career
As a youth, Copp played in the 2007 Quebec International Pee-Wee Hockey Tournament with the Detroit Compuware minor ice hockey team. The following year, he began to pursue football after his father suggested he needed to increase his physicality on the ice for hockey scouts. He continued to play quarterback while attending Skyline High School and set numerous school records in his senior year. Within the first six games of the 2011–12 season, Copp had thrown for 1,732 yards and 27 touchdowns (TD), including a state-record 557 yards and seven TDs against Pioneer. However, he suffered a broken collarbone in early October during a game against Temperance Bedford by the hands of Austin Riedmaier and missed the remainder of the season. Upon recovering from his injury, Copp accepted an NCAA Division I scholarship offer to play for the Michigan Wolverines men's ice hockey team.

Collegiate

Copp played three seasons with the Michigan Wolverines men's ice hockey team, including one as team captain. In his freshman season, which was also the Wolverines last in the Central Collegiate Hockey Association, he saw limited time on ice as the team struggled offensively. He ended the season with 11 goals and 10 assists in 38 games. At the end of his freshman season, his second year of draft eligibility, Copp was ranked 142nd amongst North American skaters by the NHL Central Scouting Bureau and was drafted 104th overall by the Winnipeg Jets in the 2013 NHL Entry Draft.

After attending the Jets' Development camp, Copp returned to the Wolverines for his sophomore season as an alternate captain. He broke out offensively in his second year, recording 29 points for second on the team in scoring and earning an All-Big Ten Honorable Mention.  At the beginning of the season, he was the recipient of the first Big Ten First Star Award after recording five points over two games. In December, Copp was named to the 2014 United States men's national junior ice hockey team Preliminary Roster prior to the 2014 World Junior Ice Hockey Championships.

Copp returned to the Wolverines for his junior, and final, season as the 85th captain in the history of the program. He was the first junior captain since Luke Glendening during the 2010–11 season. He skated in 36 games and recorded 14 goals and 17 assists. For his performance leading the Wolverines, he was recognized by the NCAA and earned All-Big Ten second-team honours. Copp opted to forgo his senior year of college hockey eligibility and signed a three-year entry-level contract with the Jets on March 26, 2015.

Professional

Winnipeg Jets
Copp made his NHL debut on April 11, 2015, playing on a line with Lee Stempniak and Matthew Halischuk against the Calgary Flames. During the game, he assisted on Stempniak's goal helping the Jets beat the Flames 5–1. Following this, he was invited to the Jets' Rookie Camp in September 2015 and competed in their exhibition games. As a result of his efforts, Copp was named to the Jets' opening night roster and recorded his second career assist in the season opener against the Boston Bruins. His first career goal came at the end of month during a 3–2 win over the Columbus Blue Jackets.

Following the season, Copp was offered two-year, $1.5 million average annual value contract but chose to file for salary arbitration. The neutral arbitrator awarded him a two-year, $4.56 million extension with the Jets.

After colliding with Carolina Hurricanes forward Jordan Staal during the second period of a Jets' 6–3 loss, Copp was listed as day-to-day by the team and missed their remaining three games before the Christmas break. On March 24, 2021, Copp scored his first career NHL hat-trick (as well as his first career NHL 4 goal game) in a 5–1 Jets win over the Vancouver Canucks.

New York Rangers
Copp was traded to the New York Rangers at the trade deadline on March 21, 2022, along with a sixth-round draft pick in exchange for Morgan Barron, a fifth-round draft pick and two conditional second-round draft picks. Copp scored his first goal with the Rangers a couple days later on March 25, in a 5–1 win over the Pittsburgh Penguins.
On April 21, during a game against the New York Islanders, Copp recorded his second career hat-trick. He was the third player in Rangers history to score a hat-trick in the first period, joining Don Raleigh (1948) and Kelly Kisio (1986). He also became the only Rangers player to score the first three goals of the game.

Detroit Red Wings
On July 13, 2022, Copp signed a five-year, $28.125 million contract with the Detroit Red Wings.

Career statistics

Regular season and playoffs

International

References

External links

1994 births
Living people
American men's ice hockey centers
Detroit Red Wings players
Ice hockey people from Ann Arbor, Michigan
Manitoba Moose players
Michigan Wolverines men's ice hockey players
New York Rangers players
USA Hockey National Team Development Program players
Winnipeg Jets draft picks
Winnipeg Jets players